Srđan Dragojević (born 1 January 1963) is a Serbian film director and screenwriter, who emerged in the 1990s as a significant figure in Serbian cinema.

From 2010 until 2017, he was affiliated with the Socialist Party of Serbia (SPS). In late August 2013 he became an SPS MP in the Serbian National Assembly.

Early life and career
Born to a journalist father Anđelko Dragojević (1934-2017) hailing from Srbica and a French translator mother Ljiljana, Dragojević described himself as a "child of middle-level communist nomenklatura in Serbia". His father worked for Belgrade-based newspapers Borba and Večernje novosti, including a managerial stint at OOUR Novosti. In his early youth, Dragojević played guitar in the punk/new wave band TV Moroni. He also dabbled in journalism, writing for  newspaper and  magazine.

He obtained a degree in clinical psychology from the University of Belgrade's Faculty of Philosophy.

In parallel, Dragojević was active in poetry, publishing a book of poems called Knjiga akcione poezije (The Book of Action Poetry) in 1986 and winning the prestigious  for it. By his own admission, much of his poetry was inspired by the 1920s Soviet art and poets like Vladimir Mayakovsky: 
Dragojević published one more book of poetry Čika kovač potkiva bebu in 1988 before devoting to film. He briefly came back to poetry in 1995 as an already established film director to release Katkad valja pročitati poneku knjigu da ne ispadnete glupi u društvu.

Cinematic career

Debut and early period
Dragojević made his directorial debut at the age of twenty-nine with 1992's Mi nismo anđeli whose screenplay he had previously written as well. What was essentially his FDU graduate thesis project, an irreverent youth comedy set in Belgrade about a geeky teenage girl who gets impregnated by a local lothario, turned out to be a huge hit in FR Yugoslavia and eventually in the rest of the former Yugoslav countries.

With his cinematic profile raised, in 1993, Dragojević was set to begin shooting a campy Almodóvaresque project tentatively titled Devedesete (The Nineties) about loyalty, jealousy, infidelity, and intimacy, with the original plan to shoot three separate endings and distribute three versions of the film. However, the financial implosion of the state-owned production studio Avala Film amid galloping inflation in FR Yugoslavia put an end to that project.

Produced by influential Serbian show business agent-manager  whose clients included local top-selling young starlets of the folk music genre, the high-budget film was envisioned as twenty-five-year-old Dragana Mirković's cinematic platform meant to showcase her in a different light musically (more dance-pop less commercial folk) and thus increase her nationwide fame, much like Đokić had managed to do for his other famous client Lepa Brena several years earlier with her Hajde da se volimo film that grew into a hugely successful two-sequel money-generating franchise. Following the same pattern, Đokić again threw funds at prominent individuals from the local cinematography. Attracted by his money, numerous Serbian film and music industry people (including Dragojević, Branka Katić, Nebojša Bakočević, Rambo Amadeus, etc.) normally completely disassociated from and even ideologically opposed to the commercial folk music milieu flocked to do the film. Still, Slatko od snova was a box-office flop, only managing to become a camp guilty pleasure in the years since for its over-the-top excess.

The year 1994 also saw Dragojević write and direct a made-for-TV musical comedy Dva sata kvalitetnog TV programa ("Two Hours of Quality TV Programming") that aired on RTS television's third channel (3K) as part of their New Year's Eve 1995 programming. During next year, 1995, he directed a couple of episodes of the RTS series Otvorena vrata ("Open Doors").

Critical acclaim
Four years after his debut, Dragojević finally returned to directing feature films - this time completely breaking out of the youth genre to tackle the gruesome issues related to the ongoing Yugoslav Wars with a controversial drama containing elements of dark comedy, Lepa sela lepo gore, set in war-torn Bosnia. In addition to critical praise, the movie made a measurable commercial impact with more than 700,000 tickets sold domestically during its theatrical run. It also raised plenty of controversy across Europe over its ideological aspects: while many saw it as a powerful denouncement of war, others viewed it as "fascist cinema". The movie was even refused entry at the 1996 Venice Film Festival in addition to splitting the jury at the 1996 Thessaloniki International Film Festival that ultimately denied it the main prize despite being an overwhelming hit with the festival's audience. In North America, the film received more or less universal critical praise as Dragojević started getting courted by Hollywood almost immediately following the film's notable run on the festival circuit across the continent. He signed with William Morris Agency in late summer 1996 and got flown to Los Angeles where he had meetings with different studio heads. However, deeply dissatisfied with the scripts he was being offered, the director decided to come back home and do another film in Serbia. Therefore, the only tangible result of his brief flirtation with Hollywood on this occasion was the deal with Fox Lorber for the North American limited theatrical and home video distribution of Lepa sela lepo gore.

Back home on the political front, Dragojević supported the 1996-97 anti-government demonstrations by speaking at rallies and taking part in protest walks.

In 1998 Dragojević gave a bleak and critical portrayal of life in Slobodan Milošević's Serbia in Rane, which was another critical success for the young director. Loosely based on a true story, its plot follows the descent of two Belgrade youngsters from youthful exuberance into juvenile delinquency and hard criminality amid economic sanctions in FR Yugoslavia as their personal relationship transforms from close friendship to impulsively vicious rivalry. Released in May 1998 and, like most local productions, funded in large part by state institutions such as the state-run broadcaster RTS, the film elicited a stern response from the government elements that did not appreciate the director's brutal portrayal of Milošević's Serbia. Though they didn't ban the movie outright, they severely impacted its promotional cycle by refusing to run the film's ads in the state-run print and electronic media outlets. During the film's promotion on the festival circuit in North America, Dragojević expressed concern that he wouldn't be allowed to continue making films in Serbia under Milošević.

Those fears didn't turn out to be unfounded as his attempts to raise funds for the film adaptation of Dušan Kovačević's 1984 theater play St. George Slays the Dragon quickly got shot down.

Hollywood years
By 1999 Dragojević had enough of Serbia as the realization set in that he wouldn't be allowed to make films the way he wants to. He thus called on his Hollywood connections in order to once again explore his options across the pond and soon opened negotiations with Miramax as he again started to get some interest from America including a January screening of Rane at the Sundance Film Festival.

In late March 1999, a week into NATO's bombing of Serbia, Dragojević boarded a bus to Budapest with his wife and their two kids and went to New York City where he had a scheduled screening of Rane organized by the Film Society of Lincoln Center at the Museum of Modern Art as part of its annual 28th New Director's/New Films series. The arrival to the country that's bombing his homeland put him in an odd and uncomfortable position and he acknowledged as much in interviews. He remained in the United States, travelling across the country with Rane that had several more festival screenings (including the San Francisco International Film Festival) while simultaneously negotiating terms with Miramax.

New York City

From July 1999, with his Miramax deal announced, Dragojević would end up spending the following two years living and working in the United States, initially in New York City. He was under the so-called first-look deal which obliged him to offer everything he's interested in developing (either his own work or someone else's work the rights for which could be bought) to Miramax first and then if Miramax refuses it, he was free to shop it around elsewhere. The deal also functioned in the other direction whereby Miramax would offer him scripts, books, stories or re-make ideas they thought fit his sensibility and he'd have the right of refusal.

However, Dragojević experienced major problems persuading the studios to sign-off on his suggestions, and he also mostly didn't like the ideas being offered to him. 

Soon upon arriving, Dragojević met with Miramax boss Harvey Weinstein who offered him Milčo Mančevski's script Dust. Dragojević refused, however, reasoning that it's a very personal script that can more or less only be directed by Mančevski, and also due to discovering that, as he put it in a later interview, "offering me that script in the first place was the Weinstein brothers' little 'fuck you' to Mančevski whom they were on bad terms with at that moment". The studio then offered Dragojević the Heaven, Hell, Purgatory trilogy, while they particularly wanted him to direct Hell, however, he turned it down vehemently, labeling the script "the dumbest thing I've ever read" in another interview. The script would eventually be filmed by Danis Tanović. Dragojević, in turn, was interested in filming Patrick Marber's play Closer from the moment he first arrived in the United States, but the studio kept turning him down, eventually hiring veteran director Mike Nichols who got to make the film in 2004. The studio then offered Dragojević Reindeer Games, with Bob Weinstein reportedly presenting it as "the best script we've got", but the director didn't particularly like it and refused, figuring something better would come along. In later interviews, Dragojević expressed regret over not taking the offer to direct Reindeer Games due to "realizing two and half years later [after getting Miramax's other script offers] that it really was the best script they had".

Los Angeles
By spring 2000, Dragojević, along with his wife and kids, relocated to Los Angeles, settling in Laurel Canyon. He would continue going to pitch meetings for studio projects he was interested in, essentially director auditions for films that were in the development phase.

He was by his own admission particularly interested in directing either Frida or View from the Top, however in the case of the former, the movie's producer and star Salma Hayek wanted a female director so the job went to Julie Taymor while in the case of the latter, the film's producers as well as its star Gwyneth Paltrow didn't like Dragojević's ironic take on the screenplay and Bruno Barreto got the job instead. He was also in the running for The Mexican, but the job went to Gore Verbinski.

The closest he got to making a Hollywood movie was the heist-comedy —The Payback All-Star Revue—that was agreed to be a co-production between Miramax and Mel Gibson's Icon Productions. The announcement was made in November 2000 with Dragojević upbeat about the project he envisioned as a "funny and commercial film containing a unique mix of genres, including Shakespearean subplots and unpredictable structures". The plot revolved around a band of lounge musicians playing in the Riviera casino in Las Vegas who decide to rob the place where they perform. Though they manage to pull off the heist successfully, they run into troubles during the getaway. Now trapped, they agree to give themselves up on the condition that they are granted an interview with a Rolling Stone reporter to tell their story. The planned plot featured a multitude of characters with many subplots. However, in the middle of pre-production the movie got canceled in 2001 due to an impending SAG strike threat and the Warner Bros.' announcement of putting Ocean's 11 remake with an all-star cast into pre-production, which Miramax thought would jeopardize Payback'''s box-office appeal. Over the following years, by now known for his frank and colourful interviews, Dragojević talked openly about the experience:
Summing up his Hollywood experience, Dragojević said:

Return to Serbia
By late 2001, Dragojević returned to his homeland without having made a film in America. With producer Biljana Prvanović, he founded a production company Delirium Films in 2002.

In early 2003 he was announced as having been hired to develop a script for and eventually direct Beautiful Game, film based on Andrew Lloyd Webber's musical that had already been staged in London's West End. Along with a young American writer, Dragojević came up with an adapted screenplay from Ben Elton's story set in West Belfast during the 1970s about a group of Protestants and Catholics playing on the same football team as sectarian tensions surround them. However, in the end nothing came of it and years later Dragojević revealed in an interview that a row erupted with producers over his desire to remove two of the songs.

Around the same time, he also tried to get several projects off the ground such as the post-Holocaust novel After by Melvin Jules Bukiet with producer friend Julia Rosenberg as well as a proposed film based on Julian Barnes' 1992 novel The Porcupine, but was unable to raise funds for either of them. He also had an idea for a film called 1999 Cum in the Rye that was conceptualized as the final installment of his 1990s trilogy, but it also couldn't raise enough funding.

Suddenly, in summer 2004, he decided to make , the sequel to his greatest commercial hit after reportedly writing the screenplay from scratch in only three weeks. Shot in co-production with Pink International Company and released in early 2005, Mi nismo anđeli 2 broke box office records in Serbia with 700,000 admission tickets sold despite receiving bad reviewsLepa nada lepa beda;Popboks, 2005 and even accusations of plagiarizing Stan Dragoti's 1989 comedy She's Out of Control. Dragojević himself on occasion referred to the film as an "open dialogue with the 1980s American B-comedy genre". Still, some observers saw his involvement in the project as an attempt at delivering a quick commercial box-office hit that would financially enable the projects he was really interested in making. Dragojević initially shied away from putting it in those terms, but several years later admitted as much explicitly in some interviews.Bez uspona i padova život je manje zanimljiv;Danas, 11 February 2012

Around the same time Dragojević wrote one of the script drafts for Uroš Stojanović's film Čarlston za Ognjenku that he wrote as a "screwball comedy or postmodern Frank Capra", however, Stojanović ultimately went into a different direction with the film.

Right afterward, Dragojević started working on the third installment of the Mi nismo anđeli franchise. The approach taken was along the lines of Hollywood cinema - the script was offered to seven directors each of whom had to make a pitch with Pašić chosen in the end. Still, the reviews were even worse than for the previous sequel and the movie was a failure at the box office. Summing up the Mi nismo anđeli sequels several years later in 2009, Dragojević said:
Dragojević was brought by John Cusack into the project titled Brand Hauser: Stuff Happens, which the Serb was slated to direct. However, the production company Nu Image led by Avi Lerner wanted the script re-written, a job that also went to Dragojević who in turn brought in Dimitrije Vojnov thus continuing their writing collaboration. The script that the duo came up with has been described by Dragojević as "a modern-day Dr. Strangelove". Dragojević then spent three months in Bulgaria doing preparation work with his set designer and director of photography, even flying out to locations in Morocco and Kazakhstan where parts of the movie were to be shot. Then weeks before the movie was scheduled to begin shooting, Cusack chimed in from London where he had been shooting 1408, voicing his displeasure with Dragojević's and Vojnov's version of the script and demanding a return to the original version co-written by Cusack himself. That spelled the end of Dragojević's involvement on the project as he decided to leave Bulgaria the next day. The movie ended up being shot with the original script and the new title War, Inc.. The only detail from Dragojević's script re-write that made it into the movie was the billboard for the fictional Democracy Light cigarette brand, which he previously used in his movie Rane.

In summer 2007, Dragojević started shooting the historical melodrama St. George Shoots the Dragon, an ambitious and expensive movie based on Dušan Kovačević's script about a love triangle against the backdrop of Serbian war effort in World War I. Funded in significant part by the governments of Serbia and Republika Srpska, the movie raised a lot of media interest in Serbia. It was by far the biggest movie project Dragojević had ever been a part of. The making of the movie, however, wasn't smooth. In the end, as the film was about to go into theater release in Serbia in mid-March 2009 even Dragojević himself admitted personal disappointment with some of the choices he made during the shooting of the film in a lengthy interview for Vreme magazine. Among other things he said: "I invested so much energy into this film that I started to believe it would become a masterpiece, but it hasn't."

In late 2010, Dragan Bjelogrlić's film Montevideo, Bog te video that Dragojević co-wrote with  came out to positive reviews and great commercial success. Simultaneously, Dragojević's political engagement in the Socialist Party of Serbia (SPS), a part of the ruling coalition in Serbia, was announced.Srđan Dragojević: Politika, Bog te video;Večernje novosti, 25 December 2010

In late October 2011, Dragojević's latest film Parada'' premiered. Covering the politically sensitive topic of gay rights in Serbia, the film generated some controversy leading up to the premiere. For his part, Dragojević boldly announced it as "the best film of my career", and soon expanded on the statement: "Saying that was the result of my satisfaction with the fact I succeeded in controlling a very risky thing - to continuously balance between the concepts of 'high comedy' and 'high drama' and to purposely impact the viewer's limbic system, thus manipulating and drawing emotions I deem necessary for every segment of the movie all of which results in the emotional and cognitive reaction I planned".

Filmography

Political career

In December 2010, Dragojević's association with Ivica Dačić's Socialist Party of Serbia (SPS) was announced with the forty-seven-year-old film director's appointment to the party's main board. Other appointments to the party's main board on the same occasion were: table tennis player Aleksandar Karakašević, LGBT activist Boris Milićević, actor Bata Živojinović, retired long-distance runner and former Olympian Franjo Mihalić, and retired handballer Svetlana Kitić. When Dragojević joined, the SPS had already been a participant in the Democratic Party (DS)-dominated multiple-party ruling coalition, closely aligned with and controlled by the Serbian President and DS leader Boris Tadić. Considering the SPS had been founded and formerly headed by Slobodan Milošević—whom Dragojević is an outspoken critic of—many in the Serbian public found the established film director's decision to join the party surprising and peculiar. In his media appearances, Dragojević placed his motivation to become politically active in the context of improving Serbian cultural policies, bringing up the "sale of Beograd Film, sorry state of Avala Film, and closure of the National Museum since 2003" as examples of things he'll try to change. He further opined that the SPS had changed since the days when Milošević headed it before stating "revival of closed cultural centers in small towns across Serbia" as his main goal in joining it while adding that the SPS was "the only party interested in my plan".

In late March 2012, Dragojević's name was submitted in the 55th spot on the party's electoral 250-person list for the 2012 parliamentary elections. In addition to the SPS members, the list also included candidates from the Party of United Pensioners of Serbia (PUPS) and United Serbia (JS). Dragojević took an active part in the electoral campaign, making TV debate show and public rally appearances. The SPS-PUPS-JS list ended up winning 44 parliamentary seats, which meant Dragojević didn't get the deputy (MP) status in the Serbian parliament. Following the election, the coalition around the Serbian Progressive Party (SNS) together with the SPS list, formed a government with Dačić as Prime Minister and Aleksandar Vučić as the First Deputy Prime Minister.

However, year and a half later, Dragojević would get the MP status. Following the August 2013 cabinet reshuffle, two SPS MPs—Branko Ružić and Aleksandar Antić—resigned their parliamentary posts due to being appointed to ministerial positions in the prime minister Ivica Dačić's and deputy PM Aleksandar Vučić's reconstructed cabinet. Ružić's and Antić's vacated parliamentary positions were thus taken over by Milutin Mrkonjić and Srđan Dragojević. In January 2014, Dragojević was criticized by his cinematic collaborator Dragan Bjelogrlić over accepting the parliamentary job: "I wish he hadn't done it. That ambiance doesn't go with him at all. He's greater than all of them. The MP post is not a degrading one per se, but when I think back to Dragojević the punk rocker or back to the 1990s when he'd quite brusquely, and often brazenly, say things straight to people's faces, now he looks like a wild boar that's been tamed and placed in the parliamentary cage".

In March 2017, Dragojević got kicked out of the SPS after publicly voicing support for the opposition candidate Saša Janković at the 2017 Serbian presidential election.

In February 2022, Dragojević became the cultural advisor to the opposition candidate Zdravko Ponoš at the 2022 Serbian presidential election.

Personal
Dragojević was married to costume designer and visual artist Tatjana Strugar from 1988 to 2007. They have three children: daughters Irina and Eva, and son Matija.

References

External links

Twitter

1963 births
Living people
Film people from Belgrade
Serbian film directors
Serbian screenwriters
Male screenwriters
University of Belgrade Faculty of Philosophy alumni
University of Belgrade Faculty of Dramatic Arts alumni
Politicians from Belgrade
Socialist Party of Serbia politicians
Members of the National Assembly (Serbia)